Mobile Module Connector 2 (MMC-2) is Intel's 400-pin processor cartridge used with Pentium II, Celeron and Pentium III mobile processors. It contains CPU, 443BX (Pentium II) Northbridge, off-die L2 cache (early Pentium II only) and voltage regulator. It is the successor of MMC-1, main differences being AGP interface and 100 MHz FSB for the Pentium III. This processor cartridge was widely used on laptops from the late 1990s to early 2000s.

Fastest processors in the MMC-2 form factor are:

 Pentium II 400/256
 Pentium III 850/256
 Celeron 700/128
 Unofficially Pentium III 1000/256, this was achieved by removing the chip off an MMC-2 socket card and soldering a Pentium III 1000 processor on the board

See also
 Notebook processor

External links
Intel Datasheet

Intel products